Cyrtopodium hatschbachii is a species of orchid. It is native to Brazil, Argentina and Paraguay.

References 

hatschbachii
Orchids of South America
Plants described in 1978